Richfield Coliseum, also known as the Coliseum at Richfield, was an indoor arena located in Richfield Township, between Cleveland and Akron, Ohio. It opened in 1974 as a replacement for the Cleveland Arena, and had a seating capacity of 20,273 for basketball. It was the main arena for the Northeast Ohio region until 1994, when it was replaced by Gund Arena in downtown Cleveland. The Coliseum stood vacant for five years before it was purchased and demolished in 1999 by the National Park Service. The site of the building was converted to a meadow and is now part of Cuyahoga Valley National Park.

The arena was primarily the home to the Cleveland Cavaliers of the National Basketball Association (NBA), developed by Cavaliers owner Nick Mileti, who also owned the Cleveland Crusaders of the World Hockey Association. Over the years it had additional tenants such as the Cleveland Barons of the National Hockey League, Cleveland Force of Major Indoor Soccer League, Cleveland Crunch of Major Indoor Soccer League, the Cleveland Lumberjacks of the International Hockey League, and the Cleveland Thunderbolts of the Arena Football League. In a 2012 interview with ESPN's Bill Simmons, basketball great Larry Bird said that it was his favorite arena to play in. The Coliseum was the site of Bird's final game in the NBA. Richfield Coliseum hosted the 1987, 1988, and 1992 editions of WWE's Survivor Series pay-per-view.

It hosted the 1981 NBA All-Star Game; The Buckeye Homecoming, the 1983 professional boxing match between Michael Dokes and Gerrie Coetzee; and the 1985 MISL All Star Game. It was also the site of the March 24, 1975 boxing match between Muhammad Ali and Chuck Wepner, which in part inspired the movie Rocky.

The Coliseum was a regular concert venue, with its first event being a concert by Frank Sinatra and the last being a concert by Roger Daltrey in 1994, which was also the last official event at the arena. The first rock concert at the Richfield Coliseum was Stevie Wonder in October 1974.

History
The arena, which opened in 1974, replaced the Cleveland Arena, which had 12,500+ boxing capacity, 10,000+ otherwise. The new arena seated 20,273 for basketball and 18,544 for hockey, and was one of the first indoor arenas to contain luxury boxes. Cavaliers founder Nick Mileti was the driving force behind the Coliseum's construction, believing that its location in northern Summit County south of Cleveland near the confluence of the Ohio Turnpike and Interstates 77 and 271 was ideally suited given the growth of urban sprawl. The Coliseum was built in Richfield to draw fans from both of Northeast Ohio's major cities, as nearly five million Ohioans lived within less than an hour's drive (in good weather) from the Coliseum. While the arena's location hindered attendance somewhat, nevertheless, the Cavaliers' average attendance was over 18,000 per game each of the last two seasons at the Coliseum.

The Force also drew well at Richfield: 20,174 attended when Cleveland took on Minnesota on April 6, 1986, still the largest regular-season crowd (and the third-largest overall) ever to see an indoor soccer match in the US.

The World Wrestling Federation also promoted several notable shows including: Saturday Night's Main Event VII (taped September 13, 1986); Survivor Series (1987); Survivor Series (1988); and Survivor Series (1992)

Attendance hindrances
Though a large arena at the time of construction, it had only one concourse for both levels, which made for very cramped conditions when attendance was anywhere close to capacity. The Coliseum's real drawback was that the revenue-producing luxury suites were at the uppermost level and, as such, were the worst seats in the house. This situation was rectified at Rocket Mortgage FieldHouse, where the suites are much closer to the playing area.

Also hurting attendance was the arena's location at the intersection of Interstate 271 and Ohio State Route 303, which was a rural, two-lane highway outside of Richfield. The rural location made the Coliseum inaccessible to anyone without an automobile, and as the only true access to the arena was directly at the interchange, traffic became an issue with every Coliseum event, especially when attendance was anywhere near capacity. Lake-effect snow from Lake Erie provided another obstacle to drivers during the winter months.

Demolition and environmental remediation
The Coliseum's fate was sealed in 1990, when voters in Cuyahoga County approved a new sin tax to fund the Gateway Sports and Entertainment Complex, which included Gund Arena, the original name of what is now Rocket Mortgage FieldHouse.  The Cavaliers moved to Gund Arena at the beginning of the 1994–95 season.

In 1997, the hardwood floor was sold to Grace Christian School of Staunton, Virginia.

After being vacant for five years, the arena was torn down in 1999, between March 30 and May 21, and the arena footprint and surrounding parking areas were allowed to be returned to woodland as part of the Cuyahoga Valley National Recreation Area, now Cuyahoga Valley National Park. Two years later it was noted that the site appeared to have no trace of the former building, although a widened section of Route 303, as well as the remains of the parking lot entrance, reveal its location.

The site is now a grassy meadow and has become an important area for wildlife. Birds such as the Eastern meadowlark, bobolink, and various sparrows now inhabit the area. This has caused the site to become popular with local birders. Other birds that are frequently seen are American goldfinch, red-winged blackbird, turkey vulture (buzzard), red-tailed hawk, and American kestrel.

Seating capacity
The seating capacity for basketball was as follows:

Concerts 
The following is a listing of concerts that took place during the time that the Coliseum was in operation:

Frank Sinatra – October 26, 1974, September 23, 1975, June 15, 1978, March 22, 1988, with Sammy Davis Jr. and November 7, 1992
Stevie Wonder – October 28, 1974 and November 16, 1980
Elton John – November 4, 1974, with Kiki Dee, August 1–2, 1976, September 29, 1980 and April 23, 1993
Yes – November 22, 1974, with Gryphon, August 21, 1976, with Natural Gas, August 17, 1977, with Donovan and the Dukes, September 19, 1978, September 20, 1980, May 2, 1984, February 16, 1988 and April 29, 1991
Deep Purple – December 6, 1974, with the Electric Light Orchestra and Elf, February 20–21, 1985, with Giuffria and May 11, 1987, with Bad Company
Led Zeppelin – January 24, 1975 and April 27–28, 1977
Jethro Tull – February 21, 1975, August 3, 1976, March 23, 1977, October 27, 1978, with Uriah Heep, October 26, 1979, October 15, 1980, with Whitesnake and October 16, 1984, with Honeymoon Suite
Alice Cooper – April 4, 1975, with Suzi Quatro, May 5, 1978, with Jay Ferguson, February 21, 1979, with The Babys and July 25, 1980, with Billy Squier and Triumph
John Denver – April 26, 1975 (2 shows), April 17–18, 1978 and March 23, 1980
Eric Clapton – July 4, 1975, with Santana, June 2, 1979, with Muddy Waters, April 23, 1987, with the Robert Cray Band, April 17, 1990 and May 20, 1992
Elvis Presley and the TCB Band – July 10 and 18, 1975 and October 23, 1976
Eagles – July 22, with Dan Fogelberg and October 21–22, 1975, March 31–April 1, 1977, with Jimmy Buffett and the Coral Reefer Band and October 21–22, 1979
Faces – August 23, 1975
The Doobie Brothers – September 16, 1975
The Allman Brothers Band – November 21, 1975, with Muddy Waters and August 26, 1990, with George Thorogood and the Destroyers
The Beach Boys – November 24, 1975, with Dave Mason and January 13, 1977
The Who – December 9, 1975, December 6, 1979 and December 13–14, 1982, with Little Steven and the Disciples of Soul
Peter Frampton – January 28, 1976, with Gary Wright and June 15, 1979
KISS – February 1 and September 3, 1976, January 8, 1978, July 18–19, 1979, with New England, February 22, 1983, with the Plasmatics, February 22, with Vandenberg and December 14, with Queensrÿche, 1984, December 11, 1985, January 15, 1988, with Ted Nugent, June 9, 1990, with Slaughter and Little Caesar and November 29, 1992, with Great White
The Robin Trower Band – March 22, 1976, with Little Richard and the Stampeders
Lynyrd Skynyrd – April 18, 1976, with Golden Earring and Outlaws (openers), and October 25, 1987, with the Rossington Band
Wings – May 10, 1976
Blue Öyster Cult – June 28, with ZZ Top and Bob Seger and the Silver Bullet Band and December 31, with Uriah Heep and Point Blank, 1976, March 25, 1978, with Be-Bop Deluxe and the Jam, October 7, 1979, with Rainbow, October 27, 1981, with Foghat and Whitford/St. Holmes and January 8, 1984, with Dokken and Aldo Nova
Poco – July 13, 1976, with the Stills–Young Band
Fleetwood Mac – July 23, 1976, with Nils Lofgren and J. D. Souther, September 26, 1977, with Kenny Loggins, August 26, 1978, May 20–21, 1980, with Christopher Cross, October 13, 1987 and November 20, 1990
Aerosmith – July 28–29, 1976, October 22, 1978, with Golden Earring, January 15, 1980, December 8, 1982, with Nazareth and Rose Tattoo, July 15 and 17, 1984, with Orion the Hunter, May 23, 1986, with Ted Nugent, November 29, 1987, with Dokken, July 19, 1988, with Guns N' Roses, July 1, 1993, with Jackyl and August 3, 1994, with Jackyl
Neil Diamond – August 6, 1976, December 6–7, 1978, June 4–5, 1982, December 18–20, 1983, January 19–20, 1989 and February 4-5, 1992
Electric Light Orchestra – August 30, 1976 and October 11, 1981, with Ellen Foley
Jefferson Starship – August 31, 1976, with Jeff Beck
Black Sabbath – November 28, 1976, with Boston, September 15, 1978, with Van Halen, October 12, 1980, with Blue Öyster Cult and Shakin' Street and December 8, 1981, with the Alvin Lee Band
Foghat – December 4, 1976, with the Climax Blues Band and Be-Bop Deluxe, February 20, 1978, with Starz, August 12, 1981 and May 12, 1983, with Triumph
Queen – January 23, with Thin Lizzy and November 27, 1977, November 25, 1978, September 21, 1980, with Dakota and July 31, 1982, with Billy Squier
Bruce Springsteen and the E Street Band – February 17, 1977, August 30 and December 31, 1978 – January 1, 1979, October 6–7, 1980, July 29–30, 1981, July 8–9, 1984, March 13–14, 1988 and August 21–22, 1992 (without the E Street Band)
Boston – October 18, 1978, with Sammy Hagar and September 23–24, 1987, with Farrenheit
Genesis – February 27, 1977, April 7, 1978, June 11, 1980 (2 shows), November 22, 1981, December 4–5, 1983 and January 25–27, 1987
Gary Wright - March 14, 1977 with Manfred Mann's Earth Band and Robert Palmer
Kansas – March 22, with the Atlanta Rhythm Section and December 2, with Pablo Cruise, 1977 and August 18, 1979, with the Tubes
Bad Company – July 22, 1977 and May 15, 1979, with Carillo
Chicago – October 30, 1977, March 21, 1985
Rod Stewart – November 3, 1977, with Air Supply, May 3 and 5, 1979, January 20, 1982, December 3, 1988, January 15, 1992 and March 4, 1994
The Kinks – November 25, 1977, with Hall and Oates and Network, September 13, 1980, with John Mellencamp, June 4, 1983 and February 14 and March 14, 1985, with Donnie Iris and the Cruisers
Utopia – December 31, 1977, with Point Blank and the Michael Stanley Band, December 31, 1979 – January 1, 1980, with Rick Derringer, April 2, 1981 and April 26, 1985, with the Tubes
Emerson, Lake & Palmer – January 25, 1978, with Jay Ferguson
Bob Seger and the Silver Bullet Band – March 31, with Sweet and December 22–23, with Molly Hatchet, 1978, June 2–3, 1983 with Michael Bolton and February 19, 1987, with the Georgia Satellites
David Bowie – April 22, 1978, July 29, 1983 and June 19–20, 1990
Michael Stanley Band – May 27, 1978 with REO Speedwagon and Cheap Trick, July 20, 1979 with Eddie Money, December 30, 1980 – January 1, 1981 with John Cougar and the Zone, December 31, 1981 – January 1, 1982 with Novo Combo and January 1, 1983
Rainbow – July 28, 1978, with Black Oak Arkansas and May 22, 1982, with Iron Maiden
Crosby, Stills & Nash – August 9, 1978 and July 29, 1990
Neil Young – September 22, 1978, with Crazy Horse, February 21, 1983, August 21, 1985, with the International Harvesters, October 10, 1986, with Crazy Horse and January 31, 1991, with Crazy Horse, Sonic Youth and Social Distortion
Billy Joel – October 11, 1978, July 1, 1980, November 7, 1982, March 23, 1984, October 29, 1986, January 11, 1987, February 26 and July 17, 1990 and January 25 and March 17, 1994
Bob Dylan – October 20, 1978
Heart – November 17, 1978 and June 6–7, 1980, with the Ian Hunter Band
Hall & Oates – November 24, 1978, with Ambrosia and City Boy, March 16, 1982, with Donnie Iris and the Cruisers and February 24, 1983, with Steel Breeze
The Moody Blues – December 1, 1978, with Jimmie Spheeris
The J. Geils Band – December 3, 1978, with Southside Johnny & the Asbury Jukes, April 12, 1980, with 3-D and December 10, 1981, with Red Rider
Styx – December 15, 1978, with Angel, October 11, 1979, with Gamma and April 9, 1981
Ted Nugent – December 29, 1978, with The Starz and September 4, 1980
Foreigner – January 12 and November 2, with Rick Derringer, 1979, November 15, 1981, with Billy Squier, and August 27, 1985, with Giuffria
Rush – February 3, 1979, with April Wine, February 18, 1980, with Max Webster, May 7–8, 1981, with FM, November 2–3, 1982, with the Rory Gallagher Band, July 5–6, 1984, with the Gary Moore Band, December 19, 1985, with the Steve Morse Band, December 17, 1987, with Tommy Shaw, June 8, 1990, with Mr. Big, November 17–18, 1991, with Eric Johnson and March 23, 1994, with Primus
Angel – March 16, 1979, with Tin Huey and Breathless
Nazareth – March 26, 1979 and March 12, 1981
Roxy Music – April 4, 1979 and May 18, 1983, with Huey Lewis and the News
The Tubes – April 21, 1979, with April Wine and Squeeze and July 18, 1981
The New Barbarians – May 8, 1979
Supertramp – June 8, 1979 and September 11, 1983
REO Speedwagon – August 26, 1979, April 17, 1981 and August 10, 1982, with Survivor
Bee Gees – September 18, 1979, with the Sweet Inspirations
The Ian Hunter Band – September 22, 1979, with the David Johansen Group and October 8, 1981, with Norman Nardini and the Tigers
Kenny Rogers – October 6, 1979, with Dottie West and the Oak Ridge Boys
Jimmy Buffett and the Coral Reefer Band – March 21, 1980, with J. D. Souther
Linda Ronstadt – April 5, 1980
Van Halen – April 29, 1980, May 27 and August 2, 1981, August 21, 1982, March 14, 1984, with Autograph and July 25–26, 1986, with Bachman–Turner Overdrive
Cheap Trick – May 1, 1980 with the Romantics and February 15, 1981 with UFO
Journey – May 9 and 11, 1980, with The Babys, May 13–14, 1982, with the Greg Kihn Band, May 24–26, 1983, with Bryan Adams and October 11–12, 1986, with Glass Tiger, with the October 11th concert being taped inside a men's bathroom.
Frank Zappa – November 10, 1980
Outlaws – April 18, 1976, with Lynyrd Skynyrd and Golden Earring, November 14, 1980, with Foghat
Judas Priest – May 1, 1981, September 22, 1982, with Iron Maiden, April 6, 1984, with Great White, May 30, 1986, with Dokken, August 17, 1988, with Cinderella, December 2, 1990, with Megadeth and Testament and August 7, 1991, with Alice Cooper, Testament, Motörhead, Metal Church and The Dangerous Toys
Tom Petty and the Heartbreakers – June 16, 1981, March 19, 1983 and February 13, 1990, with Lenny Kravitz
ZZ Top – June 17, 1981, July 18–19, 1983, with Sammy Hagar, April 16, 1986, with Jimmy Barnes and February 11–12, 1991, with the Black Crowes
Dan Fogelberg – October 31, 1981
The Rolling Stones – November 16–17, 1981, with Etta James
AC/DC – November 29, 1981, with Midnight Flyer, December 14, 1983 (postponed from September 9, 1983), with Fastway, September 22, 1985, with Yngwie Malmsteen, May 27–28, 1988 with White Lion, November 23, 1990, with Love/Hate and July 3, 1991, with L.A. Guns
The Police – January 29, 1982, with the Go-Go's and July 30, 1983, with Joan Jett and the Blackhearts
Ozzy Osbourne – January 31, 1982, with UFO and the Starfighters, February 7, 1984, with Mötley Crüe and Waysted, April 9, 1986, with Metallica, December 12, 1988, with Anthrax and July 24, 1992, with Slaughter and Ugly Kid Joe
Rick Springfield – March 19, 1982, with the Innocents
Hank Williams Jr. – April 22, 1982, with Ricky Skaggs and Terri Gibbs
Alabama – April 30, 1982, with Mickey Gilley and Johnny Lee
Asia – June 18, 1982
Kool & the Gang – July 24, 1982, with Ashford & Simpson, Stephanie Mills, Peabo Bryson and Patrice Rushen
Scorpions – August 3, 1982, with Iron Maiden and Girlschool, May 30, 1984, with Bon Jovi, September 25, 1988, with Kingdom Come and April 14, 1991, with Trixter and Great White
Olivia Newton-John – August 28, 1982
Peter Gabriel – November 24, 1982, November 18, 1986, with Youssou N'Dour and July 3, 1993
Twisted Sister – January 28, 1983 and January 12, 1986, with Dokken and Big Bam Boo
Phil Collins – February 7, 1983, June 25–26, 1985, August 19–20, 1990 and July 11–12, 1994
Billy Squier – March 31, 1983, with Def Leppard
Prince and the Revolution – April 9, 1983, with the Time and Vanity 6 and December 5–6, 1984, with Apollonia 6 and Sheila E.
Bette Midler – July 20, 1983
Iron Maiden – August 13, 1983, with Fastway, January 6, 1985, with Twisted Sister, March 14, 1987, with Waysted, July 3, 1988, with Megadeth and Frehley's Comet and February 5, 1991, with Anthrax
Robert Plant – September 4, 1983, July 15–16, 1985 and October 23, 1988, with Joan Jett and the Blackhearts
Duran Duran – February 27, 1984 and January 24, 1989, with the Pursuit of Happiness
.38 Special – March 20, 1984, with Golden Earring
Culture Club – April 9, 1984, with the Exotic Birds
Lionel Richie – June 18–19, 1984 and November 22–23, 1986, with Sheila E.
Tina Turner – August 22, 1984 and August 22, 1985, with Glenn Frey
Whitesnake – November 29, 1984 and July 15, 1988
Triumph – December 31, 1984 and November 30, 1986
Dio – January 10, with Dokken and October 25, with Rough Cutt, 1985
Roger Waters and the Bleeding Heart Band – March 20, 1985
U2 – March 25, 1985, with Lone Justice and March 26, 1992, with the Pixies
The Firm – April 20, 1985, May 10, 1986
Orchestral Manoeuvres in the Dark – August 15, 1985, with the Power Station
Luciano Pavarotti – September 15, 1985
Mötley Crüe – September 21, 1985, with Y&T, July 24 and August 1, 1987, with Whitesnake, December 3, 1989 and July 5, 1990, with Johnny Crash
Ratt – October 21, 1985, with Bon Jovi, January 4, 1987, with Poison, February 5, 1989, with Britny Fox and Kix and November 18, 1990, with Vixen
John Mellencamp – December 12, 1985 and December 3, 1987
The Hooters – March 13, 1986
Simple Minds – May 13, 1986, with the Call
Emerson, Lake & Powell – September 23, 1986
David Lee Roth – September 29, 1986, with Cinderella and April 14, 1988, with Poison
The Monkees – November 17, 1986, with Gary Puckett & The Union Gap, Herman's Hermits, and The Grass Roots
Cyndi Lauper – December 14, 1986, with Eddie Money
The Pretenders – March 26, 1987, with Iggy Pop
Bon Jovi – March 30 and May 6, 1987, with Cinderella and March 25, 1989, with Skid Row
Huey Lewis and the News – April 3, 1987, with the Robert Cray Band
Bryan Adams – July 21, 1987, with the Hooters, March 17, 1992, with the Storm and May 21, 1994
Madonna – August 4–5, 1987, with Level 42
Def Leppard – February 2, 1988, with Tesla and October 24, 1992
INXS – March 15, 1988, with Public Image Ltd and March 11, 1991, with the Soup Dragons
Pink Floyd – August 12–14, 1988
George Michael – September 3, 1988
Michael Jackson – October 10–11, 1988
Metallica – November 26, 1988, with Queensrÿche, July 8, 1989, with the Cult and November 30–December 1, 1991
Ratt February 5, 1989, with Britany Fox and Kix
Poison – February 25, 1989, with Tesla and November 29, 1990, with Warrant
Cinderella – March 18, 1989, with Winger and the BulletBoys
R.E.M. – April 6, 1989, with the Indigo Girls
The Cure – August 29, 1989, with Shelleyan Orphan and July 20, 1992, with the Cranes
Tesla – September 23, 1989, with Great White and Badlands
New Kids on the Block – November 19, 1989, with Tiffany
Barry Manilow – December 14, 1989
Richard Marx – January 26, 1990, with Poco
Janet Jackson – March 12 and September 4, 1990, with Chuckii Booker and January 3, with Tony! Toni! Toné! and July 19, 1994
The Highwaymen – March 16, 1990 and April 14, 1993
Cher – July 9, 1990
Grateful Dead – September 7–8, 1990, September 4–6, 1991, June 8–9, 1992, March 14, 1993 and March 20–21, 1994
MC Hammer – October 19, 1990, with En Vogue and Vanilla Ice
Paul Simon – March 20, 1991
Queensrÿche – May 25, 1991, with Suicidal Tendencies
Guns N' Roses – June 4–5, 1991, with Skid Row
Slayer – June 20, 1991, with Megadeth, Anthrax and Alice in Chains
Gloria Estefan - August 24, 1991
Dire Straits – February 20, 1992
Garth Brooks – December 11, 1992
Damn Yankees – December 20, 1992, with Slaugher and Jackyl
Peter Gabriel – July 3, 1993
Billy Ray Cyrus – August 27, 1993
Steely Dan – September 26, 1993
Depeche Mode – October 26, 1993, with The The
Pantera – June 23, 1994, with Biohazard and Sepultura
Whitney Houston – June 26, 1994
Roger Daltrey – September 1, 1994

References

External links

Details of the demolition at Independence Excavating's website|via=Wayback Machine
Arenas by Munsey & Suppes

Former music venues in the United States
Demolished sports venues in Ohio
Indoor ice hockey venues in the United States
Defunct National Hockey League venues
World Hockey Association venues
Buildings and structures in Summit County, Ohio
Cleveland Barons (NHL)
Cleveland Cavaliers venues
Sports in Richfield Township, Summit County, Ohio
Defunct indoor soccer venues in the United States
Defunct indoor arenas in Ohio
Former National Basketball Association venues
Defunct boxing venues in the United States
Defunct ice hockey venues in Ohio
Sports venues completed in 1974
1974 establishments in Ohio
Sports venues demolished in 1999
1999 disestablishments in Ohio